The Bangladesh famine of 1974 began in March 1974 and ended in about December of the same year. The famine is considered one of the worst in the 20th century; it was characterised by massive flooding along the Brahmaputra River as well as high mortality.

Overview
After independence in 1971, Bangladesh's economy faced a crisis. According to  Time magazine:

Warnings of famine began in March 1974 when the price of rice rose sharply. In this month "widespread starvation started in Rangpur district", the region which would become one of three most afflicted. It had only been two years and three months since the end of the war for Bangladeshi independence (December 1971) and the country's formal creation. In many ways, Bangladesh's new state and devastated infrastructure and markets were wholly unprepared to deal with the situation. Corruption among the newly appointed officials was rampant and widespread. In April, though government officials reiterated that the crisis would be temporary, rice prices continued to rise sharply and reports of starvation became more widespread. From April to July, Bangladesh was hit by heavy rainfall and a series of devastating floods along the Brahmaputra river, with notably destructive incidents in May, July; the ability of the rice crops to survive this was reduced by the growing monoculture of HYV rice. In addition, neighbouring India declined to co-operate with the government of Bangladesh. Rice crops were devastated and prices rocketed. In October rice prices peaked and conditions eased by November 1974 as foreign aid and the winter crop arrived. The famine was officially over by December, though "excess" mortality (e.g. by disease) continued well into the following year, as is the case with most famines. More people suffered in the rural areas due to starvation. Generally, regional famine intensity was correlated to flood exposure and no doubt the floods exacerbated the famine. However, though warnings of famine began long before the flood (as demonstrated above), it is to the floods which the famine is popularly blamed.

Portrait of mortality
In terms of total mortality, though figures vary, one scholar estimates 1.5 million deaths as a reasonable estimate. This number includes the post-famine mortality. Starvation was not the only factor; a significant number of deaths are attributable to cholera, malaria and diarrheic diseases. As with most famines, weakened, disease-susceptible conditions resulted in high post-famine mortalities of over 450,000.  The poor, labourers and non-landowners were especially susceptible.

Multiple authors agree that "wage labourers suffered the highest mortality for all groups". Crude death rate "among landless families was three times higher than that for families with three or more acres".

Causes
As with most famines, the causes of the Bangladesh famine were multiple. These included flooding, rapid population growth, government mismanagement of foodgrain stocks, legislation restricting movement of foodgrains between districts, foodgrain smuggling to neighbouring countries and so called distributional failures. The famine did not occur among all areas and populations but was concentrated in specific areas; particularly those hit by flooding.

In their studies of the 1974 famine, various scholars find that 1974 average foodgrain production was a 'local' peak. For this reason, scholars argue that, "food availability approach offers very little in the way of explanation of the Bangladesh famine of 1974". Rather, they argue that the Bangladesh famine was not caused by a failure in availability of food but in distribution (or entitlement), where one group gained "market command over food".

Two distributional failures stand out. The first failure was internal: the specific configuration of the state rationing system and the market resulted in speculative hoarding by farmers and traders and a consequent rise in prices.  The second failure was external: the US had withheld 2.2 million tonnes of food aid, as the then US Ambassador to Bangladesh made it abundantly clear that the US probably could not commit food aid because of Bangladesh's policy of exporting jute to Cuba. And by the time Bangladesh succumbed to the American pressure, and stopped jute exports to Cuba, the food aid in transit was "too late for famine victims".

Government response
The Government's response to the famine primarily focused on the institution of soup kitchens. By November, 1974, the government claimed it had 6,000 soup kitchens in operation across the country. A government official claimed that this helped save "five million lives". The government soup kitchens provided basic rations consisting of either a single roti, or four ounces of a porridge made of rice and daal. Other facilities provided "survival biscuits" donated by the United States.

See also
 Bengal famine (disambiguation)
 Hunger in Bangladesh

References

  Alamgir, M. (1980). Famine in South Asia: Political economy of mass starvation. Massachusetts: Oelgeschlager, Gunn & Hain
  Sen, A. (1982). Poverty and famines: An essay and entitlement and deprivation. Oxford: Clarendon.
  
  
  Baro, M. & Duebel F.T. (2006). Perspectives on vulnerability, famine and food security in sub-Saharan Africa. Annual Review of Anthropology, 35, p. 521-38.
  Hugo, G. (1984) In Currey B. & Hugo, G. (Eds.), Famine as a geographical phenomenon (pp. 7–31). Boston: Reidel.
  Sobhan, R. (1979). Politics of Food and Famine in Bangladesh. Economic and Political Weekly, 14(48)
  
  

History of Bangladesh (1971–present)
Famine
1974 disasters in Bangladesh
Famines in Bangladesh
20th-century famines